The Net Impact Case Competition (NICC) is the primary case format competition built around businesses facing sustainability challenges while succeeding financially. The competition attracts teams from top-rated business schools to Boulder, Colorado, for an annual two-day event hosted by the University of Colorado at Boulder's Leeds School of Business. Teams are judged by a variety of sustainability experts and industry leaders for a grand prize of $17,500. NICC 2013 is sponsored by Newmont Mining Corporation and previous sponsors have included Encana Natural Gas, Sun Microsystems, Ball Corporation, and Excel Energy. Current NICC presidents are Leeds MBA students Sean Saddler and Mathias Frese, assisted by casewriters Adam Block and Rob London. NICC is affiliated with Net Impact, an international nonprofit organization committed to mobilizing young professionals to use their careers to drive transformational change in their workplaces and the world.

See also
Net Impact
Corporate Social Responsibility
Social entrepreneurship
Triple Bottom Line
Socially-responsible investing
MBA Oath
Sustainable business
Microfinance

References

External links
 Net Impact Case Competition (official website)
 Net Impact (official website)

Sustainability in the United States
Business ethics organizations
Organizations established in 1993

de:Net Impact